Anthony's poison arrow frog (Epipedobates anthonyi) is a species of poison dart frog in the family Dendrobatidae. The species is endemic to Ecuador and Peru.

Etymology
The specific name, anthonyi, is in honor of American mammalogist Harold Elmer Anthony (1890–1970), who was Curator of Mammals at the American Museum of Natural History.

Description
The hind legs are short and robust. The dorsal surface is usually dark red or brown and there are several yellowish-white oblique stripes and a central longitudinal stripe.

Geographic range

Habitat
The natural habitat of E. anthonyi is the leaf litter on the floor of tropical dry forests, especially near streams.

Biology
Anthony's poison arrow frog is diurnal and terrestrial. Males are territorial. A clutch of 15 to 40 eggs is laid on the ground among leaf litter, and the male guards them till they hatch in about two weeks. He then carries the tadpoles on his back to a suitable water body where they develop (through metamorphosis) into frogs in about sixty days.  Epibatidine, an extremely toxic nicotine-like substance, was first derived from and named for Epipedobates anthonyi.  Once investigated for possible use as an analgesic agent, the alkaloid proved far too toxic for any application in human medicine and is presently used exclusively for research purposes.

Status
Anthony's poison arrow frog is listed as "Near Threatened" by the IUCN. It is also collected for medicinal use.

References

Further reading
Noble GK (1921). "Five new species of Salientia from South America". American Museum Novitates (29): 1-7. (Phyllobates anthonyi, new species, pp. 5–6, Figure 5).

Epipedobates
Frogs of South America
Amphibians of Ecuador
Amphibians of Peru
Amphibians described in 1921
Taxa named by Gladwyn Kingsley Noble
Taxonomy articles created by Polbot